Throssel Hole Buddhist Abbey is a Buddhist monastery and retreat centre located in Northumberland, in northern England. The monastic order is equally for men and women.  It follows the Serene Reflection Meditation Tradition, similar to the Sōtō Zen sect in Japan. It is part of the Order of Buddhist Contemplatives.
Throssel Hole was established in 1972.  It offers retreats, festivals and other events for anyone who wishes to learn about or deepen their practice of meditation.

References

External links
 Throssel Hole Buddhist Abbey official website

1972 establishments in England
Zen Buddhist monasteries
Buddhist monasteries in England
Soto Zen